Paul Rutherford may refer to:

Paul Rutherford (trombonist) (1940–2007), English jazz musician
Paul Rutherford (singer) (born 1959), English singer and musician from Frankie Goes to Hollywood
Paul Rutherford (powerlifter) (born 1970), Scottish powerlifter
Paul Rutherford (footballer) (born 1987), English footballer